The Armería River is a river in western Mexico. It originates in central Jalisco, and flows southward through Jalisco and Colima to empty into the Pacific Ocean.

See also
List of rivers of Mexico
List of rivers of the Americas by coastline

References

.

Rand McNally, The New International Atlas, 1993.

Rivers of Mexico
Rivers of Jalisco
Geography of Colima